River crab and harmonious/harmonize/harmonization are Internet slang terms created by Chinese netizens in reference to the Internet censorship, or other kinds of censorship in Mainland China. In Mandarin Chinese, the word "river crab" (河蟹), which originally means Chinese mitten crab, sounds similar to "harmonious/harmonize/harmonization" in the word "harmonious society" (和谐社会), ex-Chinese leader Hu Jintao's signature ideology.

Terms
The 2004 Chinese Communist Party announcement of the goal of constructing a "harmonious society" has been cited by the government of China as the reason for Internet censorship. As a result, Chinese netizens began to use the word "harmonious/harmonize/harmonization" (和谐) as a euphemism for censorship when the word for censorship itself was censored, particularly on BBSs. Following this, the word "harmonious" itself was censored, at which point Chinese netizens began to use the word for "river crab", a near homophone for "harmonious". In a further complication of meaning, sometimes aquatic product is used in place of "river crab". 

These euphemisms are also used as verbs. For example, instead of saying something has been censored, one might say "it has been harmonized" or "it has been river-crabbed".  The widespread use of "river crab" by Chinese netizens represents a sarcastic defiance against official discourse and censorship. Some observers, however, have warned that the practice may also reproduce domination, since it does not aim for the abolition of censorship. The sensitive words will remain silent as such, and as a result the everyday reappropriation of official language creates the conditions for the latter's perpetuation.

A well-known picture usually named River crab society, three wearing watches (河蟹社会，三个戴表) illustrates the slang "river crab". In the picture, the three wristwatches refer to the Three Represents, where the Mandarin expressions used for "represent" and "Wearing watch(es)" are homophones. The satirized homophone of the three watches might be created by Chinese writer Wang Xiaofeng (王小峰), whose online nickname is "Wearing three watches" (戴三个表). An offensive term "foolish bitch" is also used by anti-Communist Chinese people.

See also

Chinese Internet slang
Internet censorship in the People's Republic of China
Hexie Farm
List of Internet phenomena in China
Golden Shield Project
Baidu 10 Mythical Creatures (Internet meme)
Grass Mud Horse
Very erotic very violent

Notes

References 

Chinese Internet slang
Internet censorship in China
Internet memes
Political Internet memes
Crabs in culture
Euphemisms